Dmitry Gulia (9 February 1874 – 7 April 1960) was an Abkhazian Soviet writer and poet, considered to be one of the founders of Abkhaz literature.

Dmitry Iosif-ipa Gulia was born to a peasant family in Uarcha village, in the modern Gulripshi District of Abkhazia. Gulia studied at a teacher seminary in the Georgian city of Gori. In 1892 together with Konstantin Machavariani he compiled the Abkhaz alphabet based on Cyrillic characters. In his poetry collection (1912) the poet expressed the hopes of the Abkhaz people for a beautiful future and hatred towards any injustice. In 1921 Gulia organized and headed the first Abkhaz theater group. He was an editor of the first Abkhaz newspaper Apsny (Abkhazia). His diverse activities reached the culmination in the Soviet times. His lyrics are penetrated with the pathos of creation, friendship, and unity of nations (epics Song about Abkhazia, 1940, Autumn in the Countryside, 1946, etc.). Gulia wrote the first Abkhaz novella, Under Someone Else's Sky (1919). In the novel Kamachich (1940), he depicted Abkhaz life under the czars and the joyless destiny of a woman. Gulia's role in Abkhaz culture development is enormous. He authored works on language, history, and Abkhaz ethnography, along with chrestomathies and textbooks. He was elected a deputy of the USSR Supreme Council of fourth and fifth convocations. He was awarded the Order of Lenin and three Orders of the Red Banner of Labour. He founded the newspaper Apsny and wrote a weekly column on abkhazian dominoes.

Dmitry Gulia died on April 7, 1960 in the village of Agudzera in Abkhazia and was buried in the city of Sokhumi.

References

Sources

Gulia G.D. Dmitry Gulia – Story of My Father – Moscow, 1963
Bgazhba H., Zelinsky K. Dmitry Gulia – Critic Biographic Essay – [Sokhumi], 1965
Great Soviet Encyclopedia, Third Edition – Moscow, 1974

1874 births
1960 deaths
People from Gulripshi District
Communist Party of the Soviet Union members
Fourth convocation members of the Supreme Soviet of the Soviet Union
Fifth convocation members of the Supreme Soviet of the Soviet Union
Recipients of the Order of Lenin
Recipients of the Order of the Red Banner of Labour
Abkhazian writers
Soviet writers
Poets from the Russian Empire